Tell The World is the debut album by pop singer Daniel de Bourg, that was released in 2002 on DreamWorks Records.  Tell the World was later reissued in 2009 on de Bourg's independent label DDB Records.

All of the songs on the album were produced by the production team Tim & Bob, with the exception of "I Need an Angel", which was written and produced by R. Kelly.

Track listing
"Intro" – 1:14
"Tell the World" - Tim Kelley, Bob Robinson – 4:17  
"24 Hours" -  Kelley, Robinson – 4:05  
"Flowers" - Kelley, Robinson, de Bourg – 4:18  
"Made for Me" -  Kelley, Robinson   – 4:38  
"Don't Worry About a Thing" - de Bourg, Kelley, Robinson – 4:29  
"I Need an Angel" - R. Kelly  – 5:17  
"My World" - Kelley, Robinson   – 4:01  
"Give It to You" (Featuring Heavy D) - de Bourg, Heavy D, Kelley – 4:22  
"Let Yourself Go" - Kelley, Robinson – 4:04  
"Don't Make Me Wait" - Kelley, Robinson – 5:30  
"In the Morning" - Kelley, Robinson – 4:56  
"Really Need You" - Kelley, Robinson – 4:59  
"Shadow" - Kelley, Robinson – 4:30  
"Interlude" - Kelley, Robinson – 3:15  
"Book of Love" - Kelley, Robinson – 5:00  
"Interlude" – 0:15

Personnel
Percy Bady - Keyboards  
Daniel de Bourg - vocals  
Dalvin DeGrate - drums  
Thomas Dienner - String instruments
Assa Drori - Strings  
Brent Fischer - Strings  
Clare Fischer - String Arrangements  
Yvonne Gage Choir - Chorus  
Maurice Grants - Strings  
Tim Kelley - Executive Producer, Arranger, Drum Programming, Keyboards, Guitar, Piano   
Igor Kiskatchi - Strings  
Donnie Lyle - Guitar  
Jeffrey Morrow Choir - Chorus  
Jennifer Munday - Strings  
Andrew Picken - Strings  
Bob Robinson - Keyboards  
Julie Rogers - Strings  
Anatoly Rosinsky - Strings  
Johnny Rutledge Choir - Chorus  
Robert Sanov - Strings  
Richard Treat - Strings  
Joan Walton Choir - Chorus  
Cheryl Wilson Choir - Chorus

Production
Producers: Tim & Bob, R. Kelly
Executive producers: Tim Kelley and Bob Robinson, Robbie Robertson
Background Vocals: Daniel de Bourg,

Charts

Singles - Billboard (North America)

References

Daniel de Bourg albums
2002 debut albums
Albums produced by Tim & Bob